The Commanders of World War II were for the most part career officers. They were forced to adapt to new technologies and forged the direction of modern warfare. Some political leaders, particularly those of the principal dictatorships involved in the conflict,  Adolf Hitler (Germany), Benito Mussolini (Italy), and Hirohito (Japan), acted as supreme military commanders as well as dictators for their respective countries or empires.

Military commanders

Allied Forces

United Kingdom

France

United States

Soviet Union 

Army: Filipp Golikov

Australia

Canada

South Africa

New Zealand

Poland

Czechoslovakia

Greece

Netherlands

Luxembourg

Yugoslavia 

Dušan Simović
Milan Nedic

Republic of China

Axis Forces

Germany

Italy

Japan 

Army: Korechika Anami

Hungary

Thailand

Romania

Slovakia

Bulgaria 

Air force Stoyan Stoyanov

Others

Finland

Burma

Ukraine

See also 

 Allied leaders of World War II
 Axis leaders of World War II

References 

Military leaders of World War II